Bessmertny, Bezsmertnyi or Bezsmertny (meaning immortal) is a Ukrainian and Belarusian masculine surname. Its feminine counterpart is Bezsmertna or Bessmertnaya (Russian).

Notable people with the surname include:
Anatoliy Bezsmertnyi (born 1969), Ukrainian footballer
Dmitry Bessmertny (born 1997), Belarusian footballer
Marve Bessmertnõi (born 1988), Estonian footballer
Olga Bezsmertna (born 1983), Ukrainian soprano
Roman Bezsmertnyi (born 1965), Ukrainian politician
Yuri Bessmertny (born 1987), Belarusian Muay Thai kickboxer

See also
 
 
 Koschei Bessmertny, an archetypal male antagonist in Slavic fairy tales
 Kashchey Bessmertnyi (album) by the Russian punk group Sektor Gaza

Belarusian-language surnames
Ukrainian-language surnames